The 2004 Sacramento mayoral election was held on March 2, 2004 to elect the mayor of Sacramento, California. It saw the reelection of Heather Fargo. Since Fargo won a majority in the first round, no runoff was required.

Results

References 

2004 California elections
Mayoral elections in Sacramento, California
Sacramento